Anomiopus soledari is a species of true dung beetle that is endemic to Brazil, and can be found in the Federal District and Goiás State. It can be found in the cerrado biome, and may be a myrmecophile.

References

soledari
Endemic fauna of Brazil
Beetles described in 2004